Tremonton is a city in Box Elder County, Utah. The population was 7,647 at the time of the 2010 census.

History
Although the first settlers came to the Tremonton area in 1888, it remained largely uninhabited until just before 1900, when land agents started promoting the Bear River Valley as a place for Midwestern farmers to relocate. Small groups from Nebraska and Illinois began to arrive in 1898. These settlers were a diverse blend of Protestant faiths, in contrast to their mostly Mormon neighbors. Then an Apostolic Christian Church group came in 1901–1904. The main body was from Tremont, Illinois, joined by a few families from Ohio and Kansas. Mostly of German descent, this group was referred to as the "German colony".

When a townsite was laid out in 1903, the new town was named "Tremont" at the request of the German colony. Within four years, the post office had it renamed "Tremonton" due to confusion with the central Utah town of Fremont. Around 1907 the congregation was caught up in a larger schism of the Apostolic Church. Some moved back to the Midwest, and the German colony came to an end. But the church left a permanent mark in the name of Tremonton.

Geography
Tremonton lies in the Bear River Valley in northeastern Box Elder County. The Malad River flows through the city. Tremonton is located near the junction of Interstate 15 and Interstate 84. It is bordered on the north by the city of Garland, with which it is closely-associated.

Demographics

As of the census of 2000, there were 5,592 people, 1,698 households, and 1,397 families residing in the city. The population density was 1,066.8 people per square mile (412.0/km2). There were 1,822 housing units at an average density of 347.6 per square mile (134.3/km2). The racial makeup of the city was 91.52% White, 0.16% African American, 0.45% Native American, 1.13% Asian, 0.04% Pacific Islander, 5.22% from other races, and 1.48% from two or more races. Hispanic or Latino of any race were 9.71% of the population.

There were 1,698 households, out of which 50.6% had children under the age of 18 living with them, 70.7% were married couples living together, 9.3% had a female householder with no husband present, and 17.7% were non-families. 15.4% of all households were made up of individuals, and 6.9% had someone living alone who was 65 years of age or older. The average household size was 3.26 and the average family size was 3.67.

In the city, the population was spread out, with 39.0% under the age of 18, 10.5% from 18 to 24, 26.7% from 25 to 44, 14.7% from 45 to 64, and 9.1% who were 65 years of age or older. The median age was 25 years. For every 100 females, there were 98.7 males. For every 100 females age 18 and over, there were 94.8 males.

The median income for a household in the city was $44,784, and the median income for a family was $49,100. Males had a median income of $36,764 versus $22,149 for females. The per capita income for the city was $15,737. About 8.3% of families and 9.9% of the population were below the poverty line, including 14.3% of those under age 18 and none of those age 65 or over.

Economy
Some of the major employers include the Malt-O-Meal cereal company, West Liberty Foods, Crump-Reese Motor Co, and Intertape Polymer Group, Inc. In April 2008, La-Z-Boy announced the closure of their Tremonton facility and the layoff of all 630 employees. Some of production was moved to a facility in Ramos Arizpe, Mexico.

Education
Tremonton has two elementary schools, McKinley Elementary and North Park. Older students attend Alice C. Harris Intermediate in Tremonton, as well as Bear River Junior High School and Bear River High School, located in nearby Garland, Utah.

Notable people
 RonNell Andersen Jones, professor of law
 W. Rolfe Kerr, LDS general authority
 Camille Fronk Olson, professor
 Marlon Shirley, two-time Paralympic 100m champion
 Jay Silvester, U.S. Olympian; former Men's Discus world record holder
 David N. Weidman, retired chairman of the board and CEO of Celanese
 William A. Wilson, LDS folklorist and scholar

References

External links

 

Cities in Box Elder County, Utah
Cities in Utah
Populated places established in 1888